Bicellaria nigra  is a species of fly in the family Hybotidae. It is found in the  Palearctic .

References

External links
 Ecology of Commanster 

Hybotidae
Insects described in 1824